This is a partial list of major acquisitions in the video game industry with publicly disclosed deal values.

Acquisitions with deal value of at least USD$1 billion

Acquisitions with deal value of at least USD$100 million

Acquisitions with deal value of at least USD$1 million

Acquisitions which failed to complete

Notes

References

Lists of corporate mergers and acquisitions
Most expensive acquisitions
Most expensive acquisitions
Acquisitions
Economy-related lists of superlatives
Lists of most expensive things